G109 may refer to:
 China National Highway 109
 a painting of the William Rush and His Model series by Thomas Eakins

G 109 may refer to :
 Grob G 109